Tegede (Amharic: ጠገዴ) is one of the woredas in the Amhara Region of Ethiopia. Part of the Semien Gondar Zone, Tegeda is bordered on the south by Tach Armachiho, on the west by Mirab Armachiho, on the north by the Tigray Region, on the northeast by Debarq, and on the east by Dabat. Towns in Tegeda include Kirakir. Tegeda was part of former Sanja woreda.

Demographics
Based on the 2007 national census conducted by the Central Statistical Agency of Ethiopia (CSA), this woreda has a total population of 73,898, of whom 37,717 are men and 36,181 women; 5,359 or 7.3% are urban inhabitants. The majority of the inhabitants practiced Ethiopian Orthodox Christianity, with 97.8% reporting that as their religion, while 2.1% of the population said they were Muslim.

Notes

Districts of Amhara Region